The 1989–90 Sporting de Gijón season was the 29th season of the club in La Liga, the 15th consecutive after its last promotion.

Overview
Coach Jesús Aranguren was sacked after earning only one point in the first six matches. Carlos García Cuervo replaced him and helped the team to avoid the relegation playoffs three weeks before the end of the season.

Squad

Competitions

La Liga

Results by round

League table

Matches

Copa del Rey

Matches

Squad statistics

Appearances and goals

|}

References

External links
Profile at BDFutbol
Official website

Sporting de Gijón seasons
Sporting de Gijon